Mr. Yogi is an Indian comedy mini television series which aired from 1988 to 1989 on DD 1. It is a story of a USA settled Indian boy trying to arrange his marriage in India. It was produced and directed by Ketan Mehta, and starred Mohan Gokhale. It was based on the Gujarati novel Kimball Ravenswood by Madhu Rye which was later adapted into the 2009 movie What's Your Raashee?

Story

An MBA student from America, Yogesh Ishwarlal Patel (a. k. a. Y. I. Patel or Mr. Yogi), meets 12 girls and tries to select one of them as his bride in India. Om Puri narrated the story. The story revolves around Yogi and his search for a perfect bride.

Cast

 Mohan Gokhale - Yogesh Ishwarlal Patel
 Om Puri - Sutradhar / narrator
 Chandrakant Thakkar - Ishwarlal Patel, Mr.Yogi's father
 Arvind Joshi - Uncle
 Ravi Jhankal - Jitubhai
 Channa Ruparel-Anjali, to be bride of Mesh Rashi
 Pallavi Joshi - The bride
 Deepa Sahi - Rohini
 Radha Seth
 Kiran Bir Sethi - Jhankhana
 Sushmita Mukherjee - Keerti 
 Savita Bhatia
 Gopi Desai- Aneela 
 Anita Sareen 
 Rekha Rao - Vishaka
 Rani Gunaji 
 Shubhangi Gokhale
 Rajendranath Zutshi Conny

References

Indian television soap operas